Michael Gabriel "Gabe" Firment is an American politician and businessman serving as a member of the Louisiana House of Representatives from the 22nd district. He assumed office on January 13, 2020.

Education 
After graduating from Tioga High School in 1989, Firment earned a Bachelor of Science degree in public administration from Louisiana College in 1994 and a Master of Business Administration from Louisiana Tech University.

Career 
Outside of politics, Firment has worked in the construction and insurance industries. He was elected to the Louisiana House of Representatives in November 2019 and assumed office on January 13, 2020.

References 

Living people
Louisiana Christian University alumni
Louisiana Tech University alumni
Republican Party members of the Louisiana House of Representatives
Year of birth missing (living people)
21st-century American politicians